The Kansas City metropolitan area has a long history of sports, which has included national championship teams and championship title events.

Major professional teams

Kansas City has had teams in all five of the major, professional sports leagues; three major league teams remain today. The Kansas City Royals of Major League Baseball became the first American League expansion team to reach the playoffs (1976), to reach the World Series (1980), and to win the World Series (1985; against the state-rival St. Louis Cardinals in the "Show-Me Series"). They did not make the playoffs again until 2014, winning the American League pennant before falling in a seven-game World Series to the San Francisco Giants. The Royals would return to the World Series in 2015, defeating the New York Mets in five games, clinching the title with a 7–2 win in 12 innings.

Since moving to the city in 1963, the Kansas City Chiefs won the AFL title in 1966, ultimately losing Super Bowl I to the Green Bay Packers, and again in 1969 as the last ever AFL champion, en route to their first Super Bowl win.  They won Super Bowl IV against the Minnesota Vikings, 23–7. 50 years later, they would win Super Bowl LIV 31–20 against the San Francisco 49ers. In 2023, they won Super Bowl LVII over the Philadelphia Eagles with the score of 38-35, marking their second Super Bowl victory over the last four seasons and third Super Bowl title in franchise history.

Sporting Kansas City of Major League Soccer (MLS) plays its home games at Children's Mercy Park, formerly named Livestrong Sporting Park and Sporting Park. Kansas City has won the MLS Cup twice — first in 2000 by defeating the Chicago Fire 1–0, and next in 2013 by beating Real Salt Lake at Sporting Park.  Kansas City has won the Lamar Hunt U.S. Open Cup four times — first in 2004 by beating the Chicago Fire, next in 2012 by beating the Seattle Sounders at Sporting Park, again in 2015 by beating the Philadelphia Union, and most recently in 2017 by beating the New York Red Bulls. Kansas City was previously represented by the Kansas City Spurs in the top-level North American Soccer League (NASL) from 1968 to 1970. The Spurs captured the NASL championship in 1969, but were dissolved shortly after the 1970 NASL season. 

The Lamar Hunt U.S. Open Cup is named for Lamar Hunt; while he was best known as the founding owner of the Chiefs, he was also a principal founder of both the original North American Soccer League (NASL) and Major League Soccer (MLS).

Major league professional championships

Kansas City Chiefs (NFL)
3 Super Bowl titles
 1969 (IV)
 2019 (LIV)
 2022 (LVII)

2 American Football League (AFL) Championships
 1966 (AFL 1966)
 1969 (AFL 1969)

Kansas City Royals (MLB)
2 World Series titles
 1985
 2015

Kansas City Monarchs (NNL/NAL)
2 Negro World Series titles
 1924
 1942

Kansas City Spurs (NASL)
1 NASL title
 1969

Sporting Kansas City (MLS)
2 MLS Cup titles
 2000
 2013

FC Kansas City (NWSL)
2 NWSL titles
 2014
 2015

Other current teams

College sports

Past teams
In 1972, Kansas City gained an NBA franchise, when the Kansas City-Omaha Kings – which had originated as the Rochester Royals, before becoming the Cincinnati Royals – relocated to the city from Cincinnati; the Kings split their home games between Kansas City and Omaha, Nebraska until 1975, when the team began playing its games exclusively in Kansas City, shortening its name to the Kansas City Kings. In 1985, the Kings relocated to Sacramento, California, becoming the Sacramento Kings.

In 1974, the National Hockey League (NHL) added an expansion team in Kansas City, when the Kansas City Scouts began play. The team would suffer due to an economic downturn in the Midwest. For their second season, the Scouts sold just 2,000 of 8,000 season tickets and were almost $1 million in debt. Due to their various on- and off-ice disappointments, the franchise moved to Denver before settling on the East Coast as the New Jersey Devils.

The Kansas Crusaders won the 1993 Women's Professional Basketball WBA Championship and the Kansas City Mustangs went undefeated in 1994.

Sporting events

Kansas City is often the home of the Big 12 Basketball Tournaments.  The men's tournament is played at T-Mobile Center, while the 
women's tournament has often played at Municipal Auditorium.  Lately newer arenas in Dallas and Oklahoma City have hosted both tournaments.
Arrowhead Stadium serves as the venue for various intercollegiate football games.  Often it was the host of the Big 12 Football Title Game. On the last weekend in October, the Fall Classic rivalry game between Northwest Missouri State University and Pittsburg State University takes place here. Usually, the Bearcats of Northwest and Gorillas of Pitt State are ranked one-two in the MIAA conference. In 2005, other games at Arrowhead included Arkansas State playing host to Missouri, and Kansas hosting Oklahoma. The stadium will be one of eleven venues in the US to host matches during the 2026 FIFA World Cup. 
Kansas Speedway, located in Kansas City, Kansas, hosts many auto racing events, including two NASCAR race weekends with the Cup Series and  Truck Series in the spring and the Cup Series and Xfinity Series in the fall. The track formerly hosted a race in the IndyCar Series.
Kansas City has also hosted the 1973 Major League Baseball All-Star Game and the 2012 Major League Baseball All-Star Game at Kauffman Stadium as well as the 2013 MLS All-Star Game at the venue now known as  Children's Mercy Park. In 2006, Kansas City was awarded Super Bowl XLIX, but a vote for a rolling roof to be put over Arrowhead and Kauffman Stadiums was voted down, eliminating that possibility.
Children's Mercy Park hosted the 2013 MLS Cup Final, with Sporting KC defeating Real Salt Lake in penalty kicks.

Sports headquarters
Kansas City and nearby Overland Park, Kansas were once the home of the National Collegiate Athletic Association, and has hosted ten men's final fours, more than any other city.  However, Kansas City will be unable to host an 11th Final Four due to the NCAA's requirement starting with the 1997 tournament that all Final Four venues have a minimum seating capacity of 30,000.

In recognition of Kansas City's ten final fours, the National Association of Basketball Coaches are based in the city, and operates a full-time museum in the new Sprint Center, which opened in 2007 and is now known as T-Mobile Center.

Kansas City is home to the Mid–America Intercollegiate Athletics Association, an NCAA Division II conference of 14 schools in Kansas, Missouri, Nebraska and Oklahoma. The National Association of Intercollegiate Athletics was formed in Kansas City.  The national basketball tournament for the NAIA takes place each year in Kansas City's Municipal Auditorium.

The Negro Leagues Baseball Museum is located in the 18th and Vine district.

References